Ageitonomys neimongolensis is an extinct species of rodent which existed in Alxa Left Banner, Inner Mongolia (Nei Mongol), China during the early Oligocene period. It was first named by Wang Ban-Yue in 2010.

References

Oligocene rodents
Fossil taxa described in 2010
Extinct mammals of Asia